Dame Patricia Morgan-Webb, DBE is a British educator and academic. She was the head of Clarendon College (1991–98), and New College (1998–2003), both in Nottingham.

New College, Nottingham was established by merging four smaller colleges. The school achieved two successful national inspections, in 1996 and 2001 respectively, under Morgan-Webb's leadership. The college was awarded, among other awards, the Queen's Anniversary Award for FHE in 2002.

Morgan-Webb served as a member of the UK Qualifications and Curriculum Authority for five years (1997–2002). She was a board member of the East Midlands Regional Economic Development Agency (1998–2004) and the Derbyshire Learning and Skills Council.

Honours and awards
She was awarded a damehood for "services to Further Education" in the 2000 Honours List.

She has been Special Professor at the University of Nottingham and was awarded an Honorary Doctorate at the Nottingham Trent University in 2004

Currently
After retiring from New College in December 2003, she established an educational consulting firm known as The Morgan Webb Education Ltd.

She is a governor of Walsall College.

Morgan Webb is a trustee at Citizens Advice South East Staffordshire.

References

British academic administrators
British businesspeople
Schoolteachers from the West Midlands
Dames Commander of the Order of the British Empire
People from Sutton Coldfield
Living people
Year of birth missing (living people)
Place of birth missing (living people)
Women school principals and headteachers